León de Arroyal (Gandia, Valencia, 11 April 1755 – Vara de Rey, Cuenca, 1813) was a Spanish intellectual, poet, and writer, associated with the Salamanca school of eighteenth century literature.

Works
Odes. Madrid: D. Jehoiachin Ibarra, 1784
The epigrams. Madrid: D. Joachin Ibarra, printer, 1784.
Leonido, Ecloga, Madrid, 1794.
The Scholia Disthicos Caton with Erasmus translated and expanded by Don Leon de Arroyal. Madrid: the Office of D. Geronimo Ortega, 1797
Los disthicos de Catón con escolios de Erasmo / translated and expanded by Don Leon de Arroyal. Additional to the Fifth Book of Caton disthios. Madrid: office of D. Geronimo Ortega, 1797
Paraphrased version of the Holy Mass, 1785
Spanish version of the Little Office of Our Lady, as the Roman breviary. Madrid: D. Joachin Ibarra: will be in house Baylo, 1781
Paraphrased version of the Little Office of Our Lady, as the Roman breviary. Madrid: D. Jehoiachin Ibarra, 1784
Spanish version of the office of the deceased, with other prayers, and prayers of the Church according to the Breviary, and Roman Ritual. Madrid: D. Joachin Ibarra, 1783
Bread and bulls, 1793.
Cartas político-económicas al Conde de Lerena, 1971.
Satires (unpublished) next publication should be by Enrique Moral.

Writers from the Valencian Community
Spanish male poets
1755 births
1813 deaths
University of Salamanca alumni